The Sun Odyssey 410 is a French cruising sailboat with a hull designed by Marc Lombard and interior by Jean-Marc Piaton, first built in 2018.

The design debuted at the 2018 Annapolis Boat Show and was named the 2019 Cruising World - Boat of the Year: Midsize Cruiser.

Production
The design has been built by Jeanneau in France, since 2018 and remained in production in 2023.

Design
The Sun Odyssey 410 is a recreational keelboat, built predominantly of polyester fiberglass, with wood trim. The hard chined hull is solid fiberglass, while the deck is an injection molded fiberglass-foam sandwich. It has a 9/10 fractional sloop rig with a bowsprit, a deck-stepped mast, two sets of swept spreaders and aluminum spars made by Z-Spar, with discontinuous 1X19 stainless steel wire rigging and Technique Voile sails. The hull has a reverse stem], a slightly reverse transom with a drop-down tailgate swimming platform, dual internally mounted spade-type rudders controlled by two wheels and a fixed "L"-shaped fin keel, optional shoal-draft keel or lifting keel.

Options include an in-mast furling mainsail, an  taller mast and square-topped mainsail and a retractable bow thruster.

The fin keel model displaces  empty and carries  of cast iron ballast, the shoal draft version displaces  empty and carries  of cast iron ballast and the lifting keel version displaces  and carries  of cast iron ballast.

The design has a number if different interior configurations, with sleeping accommodation for four to six people, in two or three cabin layouts. The two cabin interior has a double island berth in the bow cabin, an "L"-shaped settee and a straight settee in the main cabin and an aft cabin with a double berth on the starboard side, with a storage area to port. The three cabin interior uses the storage area as a cabin. The galley is located on the port side, amidships. The galley is "L"-shaped and is equipped with a three-burner stove, a refrigerator and freezer, and a double sink. A navigation station is aft of the galley, on the port side. The head is located amidships on the starboard side and includes a shower. A second head may be added to the bow cabin, in which case the bunk is angled to accommodate.

For sailing downwind the design may be equipped with an asymmetrical spinnaker or a code 0 sail flown from the bowsprit.

Operational history
The boat is supported by an active class club the Jeanneau Owners Network.

In a 2018 review, Zuzana Prochazka wrote, "unfortunately, our test would have made even the most lax club race seem boisterous as we hoisted sail on the flat waters of the Chesapeake in a breeze that occasionally gusted to nine knots. Undaunted by the weather, we managed to have fun and point high despite the fluky wind. At 35 degrees apparent wind angle, we managed to sail 5.2 knots in nine knots of true breeze. When we cracked off to 120 degrees, we still carried 3.7 knots of boat speed and then we came back up to five knots at 65 degrees."

In a 2019 review for Cruising World, Herb McCormick wrote, "over the years, Jeanneau has built at least seven or eight iterations of their 40-foot offering, so it’s only fair to ask, how different can each successive version be? The answer, stated emphatically with their new Sun Odyssey 410, is that an evolved, inspired design can be incredibly unique and atypical of everything that preceded it."

In a 2021 Sail Magazine review, Charles J. Doane wrote, "with its multiplicity of layout and rig options, not to mention a choice between shoal and deep-draft keels, the Jeanneau Sun Odyssey 410 is a remarkably versatile boat."

See also
List of sailing boat types

References

External links

Keelboats
2010s sailboat type designs
Sailing yachts
Sailboat type designs by Marc Lombard Design
Sailboat type designs by Jean-Marc Piaton
Sailboat types built by Jeanneau